John Jeffreys (c. 1659 – 2 October 1715), of St. Mary Axe, London and Sheen, Surrey, was an English politician.

He was a Member (MP) for Radnorshire in the period 29 November 1692 – 1698 and for Marlborough in February 1701 – 1702 and 1705–1708, and for Breconshire in 1702–1705.

References

1650s births
1715 deaths
People from the City of London
People from Richmond, London
English MPs 1690–1695
English MPs 1695–1698
English MPs 1701–1702
English MPs 1702–1705
English MPs 1705–1707
British MPs 1707–1708
Members of the Parliament of England (pre-1707) for constituencies in Wales
Members of the Parliament of Great Britain for English constituencies